Inopsis funerea is a moth of the family Erebidae. It was described by Augustus Radcliffe Grote in 1883. It is found in North America, where it has been recorded from Arizona and South Carolina.

Adults have been recorded on wing in June.

References

 

Lithosiina
Moths described in 1883